James Hurst is a writer/creator/producer of television series with experience in scripted drama and comedy series in Canada. He launched his career with the teen drama series Degrassi: The Next Generation (CTV & TeenNick), writing thirty episodes and showrunning seasons five and six. He went on to write/produce many series, including Flashpoint (CTV & CBS), Being Erica (CBC & Soapnet), Sophie (CBC), Todd and the Book of Pure Evil (Space) and most recently The Listener (CTV & Fox Intl).  As creator, James developed the concept and wrote the pilot for the teen music drama Instant Star (CTV & Teen Nick).  Along with novelist Andrew Pyper, James is co-creator of a number of series in development.  A graduate of York University, James has won two WGC Screenwriting Awards (2004 & 2005) and received three nominations (2006, 2007, 2010).  He has also received two Gemini nominations (2007 & 2004).  Wearing a different hat, James has also contributed to WireTap and This American Life, both for Public Radio International.

References

External links

Canadian television writers
Canadian television producers
Living people
Year of birth missing (living people)